mac Néill is an Irish surname. Notable people with the surname include:

 Áed mac Néill (disambiguation)
 Cathal mac Néill (died 729), Irish king
 Coirpre mac Néill (died after 485), founder of the Cenél Coirpri
 Eógan mac Néill (died 465), Irish king
 Fiachu mac Néill (fl. 507–514), Irish king
 Fogartach mac Néill (died 724), Irish king
 Lóegaire mac Néill (died c. 462), son of Niall of the Nine Hostages
 Maine mac Néill (died 712), Irish king
 Muirchertach mac Néill (died 943), Irish king

See also
 MacNeill

Surnames of Irish origin